Martyre is a music album released in 2000 by the band Saturnus.

Martyre (disambiguation) may also refer to:

La Martyre, a commune in the Finistère department of Brittany, France

See also
Martyr (disambiguation)